Lauro de Freitas is a municipality in Bahia, Brazil. Lauro de Freitas has a population density of 3,376 inhabitants per square kilometer.

Until July 31, 1962 it was a district of Salvador, named Santo Amaro de Ipitanga; after acquiring city status, it changed its name as an homage to politician and engineer Lauro Farani Pedreira de Freitas (1901–1950), who lived there most of his life and died in a plane crash. Vilas do Atlântico, a wealthy neighborhood, is located in Lauro de Freitas.

Services
The monastery of Priorado São Norberto runs the Centro Comunitário Cristo Libertador, which supports various charities throughout the region.

Notable people
Damião Experiença, singer-songwriter, lyricist, multi-instrumentalist

References

Populated coastal places in Bahia
Municipalities in Bahia
1962 establishments in Brazil
Populated places established in 1962